Brian Ilad (born June 13, 1985) is a Filipino professional basketball player for the Bicol Volcanoes of the Maharlika Pilipinas Basketball League (MPBL). He previously played for the Air21 Express of the Philippine Basketball Association (PBA). He was drafted 16th overall in 2011 by the B-Meg Llamados. He was traded to the Clickers for Mark Barroca.

College career
Ilad played for the De La Salle Green Archers Men's Senior Basketball team. In 2007, He was one of the members of the De La Salle Green Archers who won the title against the UE Red Warriors who finished 14–0 in the elimination round gaining an outright finals berth in a sweep 2-0. On that last game where the Red Warriors were gunning for a 14–0 sweep, Ilad, who was on the bench, punch UE's Mark Fampulme on the back of the head. Ilad was then issued a disqualifying foul, and the University Athletic Association of the Philippines suspended Ilad for five games; as the Green Archers could only play five games or less, Ilad was effectively suspended for the rest of the season, including La Salle's finals rematch vs. UE.

Professional career

PBA
In the 2011 PBA draft, he was drafted 16th overall by the Llamados. However, he was traded to the Clickers for Mark Barroca.

PBA D-League
Ilad played for the Cebuana Lhuillier Gems in the PBA Developmental League until 2014 when he decided to take a break from professional basketball.

MPBL
In 2018, Ilad returned to playing professional basketball. He play for the Pasay Voyagers of the Maharlika Pilipinas Basketball League starting the 2018 MPBL Datu Cup.

However, in the middle of the 2018 Datu Cup, Ilad was waived by the Voyagers, but was picked up by the Cebu City Sharks.

Personal life
After leaving Cebuana Lhuillier, Ilad worked in Dubai in the United Arab Emirates for a year. While in the Persian Gulf country, he participated in local basketball leagues.

References

1989 births
Living people
Air21 Express players
Centers (basketball)
Filipino men's basketball players
Power forwards (basketball)
De La Salle Green Archers basketball players
Filipino expatriates in the United Arab Emirates
Maharlika Pilipinas Basketball League players
Magnolia Hotshots draft picks